Bel Schenk (born 1975) is an Australian poet resident in Melbourne. She has performed her work widely in venues around Australia.

Schenk was born in Adelaide, South Australia.

She is the author of Every Time You Close Your Eyes (2014), Ambulances & Dreamers (2008) and Urban Squeeze.

From 2008 to 2011 Schenk was employed as the artistic director of Express Media in Melbourne, and worked for many years prior to that at the SA Writers' Centre.

Selected works
 Every Time You Close Your Eyes (2014) 
 Ambulances & Dreamers (2008) 
 Urban Squeeze (2003)

References

Further reading
 Express Media
 Lifting the Roof and Showing us Inside: Geoff Lemon launches ’Every Time You Close Your Eyes’ by Bel Schenk. Geoff Lemon's launch speech for Every Time You Close Your Eyes in The Rochford Street Review, 7 April 2015.

Writers from Adelaide
Australian women poets
Living people
1975 births